The Guo-Yan Building BC is a residential skyscraper located in Lingya District, Kaohsiung, Taiwan. As of December 2020, it is the fifth tallest building in Kaohsiung and the 20th tallest in Taiwan.

See also 
 List of tallest buildings in Taiwan
 List of tallest buildings in Kaohsiung

References

2013 establishments in Taiwan
Apartment buildings in Taiwan
Residential buildings completed in 2013
Residential skyscrapers in Taiwan
Skyscrapers in Kaohsiung